Parajana lamani is a moth in the family Eupterotidae described by Per Olof Christopher Aurivillius in 1906. The Global Lepidoptera Names Index has Parajana gabunica listed as a synonym of this species. It is found in the Democratic Republic of the Congo (Kongo Central, Orientale) and Togo.

References

Moths described in 1906
Eupterotinae